Lion Island is a small uninhabited island in the River Thames in England on the reach above Old Windsor Lock, near Old Windsor, Berkshire.  The island is a thin wooded strip separated by a narrow channel on the north bank. It is just above Old Windsor Weir and the head of New Cut which leads to Old Windsor Lock. 

The island is the relict of three long parallel islands which existed at this point before the creation of the Old Windsor Lock cut. One of these was called Nickcroft Ait, and an obstruction known as "Newman's Bucks" existed between two of them

See also
Islands in the River Thames

References

Islands of Berkshire
Islands of the River Thames
Uninhabited islands of England
Old Windsor